Modakkurichi is a legislative assembly constituency in the Indian state of Tamil Nadu. Its State Assembly Constituency number is 100. It is one of the 234 State Legislative Assembly Constituencies in Tamil Nadu, in India.

It Covers Sivagiri, Modakkurichi & some parts of Erode City. It is included in Erode Parliamentary Constituency.

During 1996 Assembly elections, a record 1033 candidates contested the Modakurachi Assembly seat. To check a repeat of this, the Election Commission increased the security deposit amount in the next elections.

Elections and winners in the constituency are listed below.

Madras State

Tamil Nadu

Election results

2021

2016

2011

2006

2001

1996

1991

1989

1984

1980

1977

1971

1967

1952

References 
 

Assembly constituencies of Tamil Nadu
Erode district